Sharon Needles (born November 28, 1981) is the stage name of Aaron R. Coady, an American drag performer and recording artist. A self-described "stupid genius, reviled sweetheart, and PBR princess", Needles rose to international attention on the fourth season of the Logo reality competition series RuPaul's Drag Race, where she quickly became a fan favorite and was subsequently crowned "America's Next Drag Superstar" in April 2012. 

After winning Drag Race, Needles released her debut album PG-13 in January 2013. It debuted at number 186 on the Billboard 200 and number nine on Dance/Electronic Albums. Later, Needles  released the US Dance/Electronic chart top-ten albums Taxidermy (2015), Battle Axe (2017), Spoopy (2019), and Absolute Zero (2022). 

In the late 2010s and early 2020s, Needles was subject to marked criticism in response to allegations of racially insensitive behavior and sexual misconduct. Nevertheless, she remains active and her official YouTube channel has accumulated over 11 million views ; four of her videos surpassing a million views on YouTube and another one surpassing two million views on YouTube.

Early life
Aaron Coady was born to Joan Coady on November 28, 1981, in Newton, Iowa. He has been candid in discussing his childhood years growing up in Iowa as a difficult time when he faced anti-gay and anti-"outsider" harassment, which prompted him to drop out of school before he could complete his high school education.

Coady began doing drag in 1997 and, in 2004, he moved to Pittsburgh, Pennsylvania, where he began working as a professional drag performer with the stage name Sharon Needles (a pun on the phrase "sharin' needles") in nightclubs and various other venues with the drag troupe "the Haus of Haunt", which Needles describes as "one punk rock, messy mash up of very talented, fucked up weirdos".

Career

In November 2011, it was announced that Needles had been selected to compete as a contestant on the fourth season of RuPaul's Drag Race. The season premiered on January 30, 2012, and with Needles winning the first challenge she became an instant stand-out for her "ghoulish" fashion sense and unconventional make-up choices. On the night of the premiere episode, Entertainment Weekly columnist Tanner Stransky hailed Needles' macabre style as "drop dead genius" and rhetorically asked "Is Sharon Needles the most 'sickening' (a drag term for 'fabulous') contestant ever?"

Throughout the fourth season of Drag Race, Needles endeared herself to audiences and became a favorite of the media, judges, and viewers alike for her quick wit, confidence, humility and uniqueness, as well as for her "transgressive" aesthetic. On March 27, 2012, Lady Gaga tweeted – "Sharon Needles looks FABULOUS 2night on drag race. Very Born This Way outfit/fame monster wig. Any rentals for my tour? #needthatbodysuit." Needles herself admitted that she was ambivalent in believing that she could win, stating, "(B)eing a comedic, campy, shtick queen and seeing how far those types of queens made it in past seasons, I would have been shocked if I made it past the first day."

In a departure from previous seasons of Drag Race, where rumors of previous winners had leaked before the final episodes could air, the decision was made not to pre-tape the finale episode announcing the season's winner. Instead, RuPaul decided to give fans an opportunity to voice their opinions as to who should win before taping of the final episode on April 25, 2012. For the taping, three outcomes were filmed announcing each of the "final 3" as the winner, with the true outcome only known to RuPaul and a select few involved in the editing. The finale episode aired on April 30, 2012, when it was announced that Needles had been crowned "America's Next Drag Superstar".

In June 2012, Needles won the Facebook vote to appear as a contestant on RuPaul's Drag Race: All Stars, but declined, as the reigning champion, to participate in the competition. She also confirmed that her replacement in the competition would be fellow RuPaul's Drag U professor and the runner-up in the Facebook voting, Pandora Boxx. Needles became a horror host in October 2012 when she began presenting horror and suspense films airing on the Logo network under the series title Fearce! Needles also became the face of an advertising campaign by the People for the Ethical Treatment of Animals promoting vegetarianism, appearing on billboards throughout the United States. In June 2012, the Pittsburgh City Council issued an official proclamation declaring June 12, 2012, "Sharon Needles Day."

On January 29, 2013, Needles released her debut studio album PG-13, which debuted at number 186 on the US Billboard 200 chart, selling 3,000 copies in its first week. In April 2013, Needles was featured on the single "RuPaulogize," from Willam Belli's debut album The Wreckoning.

In September 2015, Needles released "Dracula" as the lead single from her second studio album. Needles released her second studio album titled Taxidermy on October 31, 2015. The second single, released on August 5, 2016, was "Hollywoodn't". The music video was once again directed by Santiago Felipe and explored the dark side of Hollywood. In the video, Needles portrayed Elizabeth Short, a.k.a. the Black Dahlia, Sharon Tate and Jayne Mansfield. Her third studio album, Battle Axe, debuted on October 6, 2017, along with a video for the single of the same name. The second single from the album was "Andy Warhol Is Dead", released on November 5, 2017. She contributed to the compilation album Christmas Queens 3 (2017).

Sharon Needles was also voted the "Best Drag Performer" of Pittsburgh 2015 by the staff of the Pittsburgh City Paper.

Personal life
Needles lives in Pittsburgh, Pennsylvania.

Needles was in a four-year relationship with fellow RuPaul's Drag Race contestant Justin Honard, better known by his stage name Alaska Thunderfuck; they ended their relationship in 2013 but remained friends. Needles was also in a long-term relationship with special FX artist Chad O'Connell. The two began dating in late 2013 and got engaged in 2015. They broke up in summer 2020.

Controversies 

Needles has been widely criticized for her consistent and frequent usage of the word "nigger", with some recounting incidents where she used the word in public. Needles has also been criticized for use of heavy racial imagery in her show, with activists Enakai and Maura Ciseaux saying that "by employing racist language and imagery in her act, Needles may be perpetuating [a racist] environment."

Discography

Studio albums

Extended play

Singles

Other appearances

Music videos

Filmography

Film

Television

Music videos

Web series

Notes

References

External links

 
 
 

1981 births
Living people
American drag queens
Horror hosts
LGBT people from Iowa
LGBT people from Pennsylvania
American LGBT singers
People from Newton, Iowa
People from Pittsburgh
Sharon Needles